Günter Fink (17 March 1918 – 15 May 1943) was a German Luftwaffe ace and recipient of the Knight's Cross of the Iron Cross during World War II.  The Knight's Cross of the Iron Cross was awarded to recognise extreme battlefield bravery or successful military leadership.  Günter Fink was killed on 15 May 1943 after engaging in aerial combat with B-17 bombers.  During his career he was credited with 46 aerial victories, all on the Eastern Front.

Awards
 Aviator badge
 Front Flying Clasp of the Luftwaffe
 Ehrenpokal der Luftwaffe (3 August 1942)
 Iron Cross (1939)
 2nd Class
 1st Class
 German Cross in Gold on 27 October 1942 as Oberleutnant in the III./Jagdgeschwader 54
 Knight's Cross of the Iron Cross on 14 March 1943 as Oberleutnant and pilot in the 8./Jagdgeschwader 54

References

Citations

Bibliography

External links
TracesOfWar.com
Aces of the Luftwaffe

1918 births
1943 deaths
Luftwaffe pilots
German World War II flying aces
Recipients of the Gold German Cross
Recipients of the Knight's Cross of the Iron Cross
Luftwaffe  personnel killed in World War II
Military personnel from Berlin
Missing in action of World War II